This is a list of the first women lawyer(s) and judge(s) in Minnesota. It includes the year in which the women were admitted to practice law (in parentheses). Also included are women who achieved other distinctions such becoming the first in their state to graduate from law school or become a political figure.

Firsts in state history

Law School 

 Sothea Phea Poch: First Cambodian (female) to graduate from a Minnesota law school (upon her graduation from the Hamline University Law School in 1999)
 Maureen Onyelobi: First (African American) female to take a law school test while incarcerated in Minnesota (2021)

Lawyers 

Martha Angle Dorsett (1878): First female lawyer in Minnesota 
Lena O. Smith (1921): First African American female lawyer in Minnesota
Margaret Treuer (1977): First Native American (Ojibwe) (female) lawyer in Minnesota. She would later become a tribal judge.
Ilean Her and Pacyinz Lyfoung (1994): First Hmong American female lawyers in Minnesota
Lola Velazquez-Aguilu: First Latino American female to serve as the Chair of the Minnesota Commission on Judicial Selection
Amran Farah (2013): Reputed to be the first Somali American (female) to make partner at a major Minnesota law firm (2020)

State judges 

 Eleanor Nolan: First female to briefly serve as a municipal court judge in Minnesota (1940)
Betty Whitlock Washburn: First female judge in Minnesota (1950)
Rosalie E. Wahl: First female to serve on the Minnesota Supreme Court (1977)
 Pamela Alexander: First African American female judge in Minnesota (1983)

Linda S. Titus (1978): First female to serve on the Fifth Judicial District in Minnesota (1990)
 Leslie Metzen (1979): First female to serve on the First Judicial District in Minnesota
 Natalie Hudson: First African American female to serve on the Minnesota Court of Appeals (2002)
 Regina Chu: First Asian American female judge in Minnesota (2002)
Susan N. Burke: First Japanese American (female) judge in Minnesota (2004)
 Wilhelmina Wright (1998): First African American female to serve on the Minnesota Supreme Court (2012)
Margaret Chutich (1984): First openly LGBT female to serve on the Minnesota Supreme Court (2016)
Anne McKeig (1992): First Native American (Ojibwe) [female] to serve on the Minnesota Supreme Court (2016)
Sophia Vuelo (1999): First Hmong American female judge in Minnesota (2017)
 Sarah Wheelock: First Native American (Meskwaki Nation female) to serve on the Minnesota Court of Appeals (2021)

Federal judges 
 Margaret Treuer (1977): First Native American (Ojibwe) female to serve as a U.S. Magistrate for the United States District Court for the District of Minnesota (1983)
 Margaret A. Mahoney: First female to serve on the U.S. Bankruptcy Court in Minnesota (1984)

 Diana E. Murphy: First female federal judge in Minnesota (1994)

Attorney General 

 Lori Swanson: First female Attorney General of Minnesota (2007)

Deputy Attorney General 

 Luz María Frías: First Latino American female to serve as the Deputy Attorney General of Minnesota

Solicitor General 

 Cathy Haukedahl (1979): First female Solicitor General of Minnesota

United States Attorney 

Rachel Paulose (1997): First Indian American female to serve as the U.S. Attorney for the District of Minnesota (2006)

County Attorney 

 Mary P. Walbran (1937): First female to serve as a County Attorney in Minnesota (1943)
Helen Hill Bianz and Susan Grimsley: First females elected as County Attorneys in Minnesota (1977-1978)

Assistant County Attorney 

 Phyllis Jean Jones: First female to serve as an Assistant County Attorney in Minnesota

Bar Association 

 Helen Kelly: First female to serve as the President of the Minnesota State Bar Association (1987-1988)
Sonia Miller-Van Oort: First Hispanic American female (and Hispanic American in general) to serve as the President of the Minnesota State Bar Association (2017)
Luz Maria Frias: First female to serve as the President of the Minnesota Hispanic Bar Association

Firsts in local history 
 Gail Murray: First female judge in Northern Minnesota (1967)
 Flora E. Matteson, Marie A. McDermott, Nora L. Morton: First females to graduate from the University of Minnesota Law School (1893) [Hennepin and Ramsey Counties, Minnesota]
 Kaoly Lyfoung: First Hmong American female to earn a law degree from the University of Minnesota [Hennepin and Ramsey Counties, Minnesota]
 Joyce Anne Hughes: First African American female to earn a law degree from the University of Minnesota (1965). In 1971, she became the first African American (female) professor at the same school. [Hennepin and Ramsey Counties, Minnesota]

 Elizabeth A. Hayden (1979): First female judge north of Anoka County, Minnesota (1986)

 Leslie Beiers: First female to serve on the Carlton County Sixth Judicial District (2014)

 Leslie Metzen (1979): First female judge in Dakota County, Minnesota (1986)

 Susan Grimsley: First female elected as County Attorney in Dodge County, Minnesota (c. 1977/1978)

 Betty Whitlock Washburn: First female judge in Hennepin County, Minnesota (1950)
LaJune Johnson-Lange: First African American female to serve as an Assistant Public Defender in Hennepin County, Minnesota (1978)
Helen Kelly: First female to serve as the President of the Hennepin County Bar Association (1981)
Pamela Alexander: First African American female judge in Hennepin County, Minnesota (1983)
Amy Klobuchar: First female elected as the County Attorney for Hennepin County, Minnesota (1999) 
Mary Moriarty: First female to serve as the Chief Public Defender for Hennepin County, Minnesota (2014) 
Adine Momoh: First minority female to serve as the President of the Hennepin County Bar Association, Minnesota (2018)

 Helen Hill Bianz: First female elected as County Attorney in Itasco County, Minnesota (c. 1977/1978)

Phyllis Jean Jones: First female to serve as an Assistant County Attorney in Ramsey County, Minnesota 
Harriet Lansing (1970): First female judge in Ramsey County, Minnesota (1978)
 Gail Chang Bohr (c. 1991): First Asian American (female) judge in Ramsey County, Minnesota (2009)
 Monica Dooner Lindgren: First Latino American female to serve as the President for the Ramsey County Bar Association (2021)

 R. Kathleen Morris: First female to serve as the County Attorney for Scott County, Minnesota

Elizabeth A. Hayden (1979): First female judge in Stearns County, Minnesota
 Virginia Marso (1978): First female lawyer in St. Cloud, Stearns County, Minnesota
 Janelle P. Kendall (1990): First female County Attorney in Stearns County, Minnesota

 Mary P. Walbran (1937): First female lawyer in Steele County, Minnesota

Juanita Freeman: First African American female (and African American in general) to serve on the  Tenth Judicial District in Washington County, Minnesota (2018)

 Karin Sonneman: First female to serve as the County Attorney for Winona County, Minnesota (2010)

See also  

 List of first women lawyers and judges in the United States
 Timeline of women lawyers in the United States
 Women in law

Other topics of interest 

 List of first minority male lawyers and judges in the United States
 List of first minority male lawyers and judges in Minnesota

References 

Lawyers, Minnesota, first
Minnesota, first
Women, Minnesota, first
Women, Minnesota, first
History of women in Minnesota
Minnesota lawyers
Lists of people from Minnesota